Mathews is a given name. It may refer to:

 Mathews I or Baselios Marthoma Mathews I (1907–1996), Supreme Primate of Malankara Church, also known as Indian Orthodox Church
 Mathews II or Baselios Marthoma Mathews II (1915–2006) was the Supreme Primate of the Malankara Church, also known as Indian Orthodox Church

See also
Mathew
Mathews (surname)
Matthews (disambiguation)